Sar Sardaray (also spelled: Sarsardaray)(Pashto: سرسردارے)is an administrative unit, known as Village Council in Union Council Aka Maruf Bami Khel in Tehsil Babuzai, of Swat District in the Khyber Pakhtunkhwa province of Pakistan.

According to Khyber Pakhtunkhwa Local Government Act 2013. District Swat has 214 Wards, of which total amount of Village Councils is 170, and Neighborhood is 44.

Aka Maruf Bami Khel is Territorial Ward, which is further divided in four Village Councils: Sar Sardarai, Banjot, Kass and Bishbanr.

According to Election Commission of Pakistan, Sar Sardaray consists of:

 PC Sar Sardaray (Mauza Sar Sardaray)

Population of Village Council Sar Sardaray is 5026, and no of General Seats in Local Bodies Election is 6.

See also 
 Aka Maruf Bami Khel
 Babuzai
 Manglawar
 Swat District

References

External links
 Khyber-Pakhtunkhwa Government website section on Lower Dir
 United Nations
 Hajjinfo.org Uploads
 PBS paiman.jsi.com
 Neighbourhood Council

Swat District
Populated places in Swat District